The men's 1 mile event at the 1954 British Empire and Commonwealth Games was held on 6 and 7 August at the Empire Stadium in Vancouver, Canada.

The final race – dubbed The Miracle Mile – represented a landmark in the history of the Four-minute mile. Roger Bannister had been the first to have broken the barrier earlier that year, but John Landy followed soon after with sub-4 minute (and world record time) of his own. The games offered the first time that two sub-4 minute runners had duelled against each other. Landy led until the final curve, at which point he turned left to gauge Bannister's position. Bannister took the opportunity to overtake him on his blind side and he edged out a victory over Landy with a time of 3:58.8 minutes. Landy also ran under four minutes, representing the first time two men had done so in the same race. A sculpture of the race-deciding moment was later placed outside the stadium in memory of the duel.

Medalists

Results

Heats

Qualification: First 4 in each heat (Q) qualify directly for the final.

Final

References

Athletics at the 1954 British Empire and Commonwealth Games
1954